Senate elections were held in Thailand on 19 April 2006. All 1,463 candidates for the 200 seats ran as independents, as they were forbidden from belonging to a political party or campaigning. Despite the party ban, around 106 seats went to candidates deemed supporters of the Thai Rak Thai party, whilst 36 were won by candidates associated with the party's ally, Thai Nation Party.

Voter turnout was 62.5%. Election-related violence by separatists in the south of the country saw three people killed and 21 injured.

Results

References

Thailand
Senate election
Elections in Thailand
Non-partisan elections
Election and referendum articles with incomplete results